Glen Cannich is a long glen in the Northwest Highlands of Scotland and through which runs the River Cannich. Emerging from the reservoir of Loch Mullardoch, the river flows east to merge with the River Affric at the village of Cannich, their combined waters forming the River Glass.

Downstream of Loch Mullardoch are the smaller natural lochs of Loch a' Bhana, Loch Sealbhanach, Loch Carrie and Loch Craskie through each of which the river flows. Other lochs within the Cannich catchment include (from west to east) Loch an Fraoich-choire, Coire Lochan, Loch a' Choire Dhomhain, Loch a' Choire Bhig, Loch Tuill Bhearnach and Lochan a' Mhill Dhuibh. Within the narrow confines of the eastern end of the glen the river plunges over two waterfalls; Eas Maol Mhairi and Eas an Fhithich. Innumerable burns drain the mountain slopes to the north and south of the river, the largest of which are the Abhainn a' Choilich and Abhainn Sithidh which arise on the eastern slopes of the peak of Sgurr nan Ceathreamhnan.

A minor public road runs up Glen Cannich from Cannich as far as the Mullardoch dam. Other than water capture for the hydro-electric scheme, the major land uses in the glen are forestry and deer stalking.

References

External links
 Images of Glen Cannich on Geograph website

Glens of Scotland
Valleys of Highland (council area)